Zhang Yangyang  (Yangyang Eryang born October 1, 1991) is a Chinese pop singer, who rose to fame through 2013 Super Boy, one of the most popular televised singing competition, by winning the 6th prize.

Bibliography

Zhang Yangyang graduated from the Xinjiang Police College. 
Instead of becoming a policeman, he chose to pursue his music dream.

Music

Singles

Soundtrack

2013 Super Boys Contesting Songs

Movie Soundtracks 

《怒放2013》 soundtrack 《Goodbye Youth 青春再见》 （with 华晨宇，白举纲，左立）

2013 Super Boys Concert Tours 

 Beijing 《一见钟情》，《最勇敢的爱》， 《北京北京》 （with 白举纲，左立），《爱情鸟》（with Oho Ou）
 Shanghai 《一见钟情》，《Rolling In The Deep》，《当你》 (with 于朦胧），《爱情鸟》（with Oho Ou）
 Wuhan 《一见钟情》，《Rolling In The Deep》，《亲密爱人》（with 左立）
 Shenzhen 《我的歌声里》，《可惜不是你》，《光荣》 （with Oho Ou）
 Chongqing 《棉花糖》，《可惜不是你》，《花儿为什么这样红》+《难道》 （with 于朦胧，居来提），《光荣》（with Oho Ou）
 Nanjing
 Guangzhou
 Chengdu

Fans Meeting 

 Nanjing 《Wind Gap 风口》， 《Rolling In The Deep + Bad Romance》
 Ningxiang 《First Sight Love 一见钟情》，《爱你等于爱自己》 （with 宁桓宇）
 Shenzhen 《The Bravest Love 最勇敢的爱》
 Xinjiang Christmas Party 《 Wind Gap 风口》

TV Shows 
 Day Day Up 天天向上
 Happy Camp 快乐大本营
 Sing if you want to 想唱就唱
 Men to the left, Women to the right 男左女右
 I love super stars 我爱大牌之海涛跑快男

References

External links
Official Weibo
Official 2013 Super Boys
Tian Yu

1991 births
Living people
Singers from Xinjiang
People from Tacheng
Super Boy contestants